Theodore Dwight may refer to:  

 Theodore Dwight (elder) (1764–1846), Federalist member of  U.S. Congress
 Theodore Dwight (author) (1796–1866), author, son of Theodore Dwight
 Theodore William Dwight (1822–1892), U.S. jurist
 Theodore Frelinghuysen Dwight, American librarian, archivist, and diplomat

See also
 Theodore Dwight Weld, abolitionist
 Theodore Dwight Woolsey, president of Yale College